État 3701 to 3755 were a series of 4-6-0 de Glenn compound steam locomotives of the Chemins de fer de l'État built between 1901 and 1909.

Nene Valley Railway By SNCF Nord Locomotives.

Description
The class were four-cylinder compound locomotives of the de Glehn type – the high-pressure cylinders were on the outside and drove the middle coupled wheels, the low-pressure cylinders were inside, and drove the leading coupled wheels.

They were mixed traffic locomotives, for use on express and local passenger trains as well as freight trains on all parts of the État network. The design was inspired by, and similar to Midi 1301 to 1370, Nord 3.078 to 3.354, and PO 1721 to 1735.

The first 30 had Wegner brakes, the remainder had Westinghouse brakes.

Use
They were used thought the État network, and proved to be more economical than the 4-4-0 and 2-4-2 locomotive that they displaced. They were allocated to the locomotive depots of Nantes Sainte-Anne, La Roche-sur-Yon, La Rochelle, Saintes, Saint-Mariens, Cholet, Thouars, and Bressuire.

After 1938, the newly created SNCF renumbered the locomotives 3-230.B.1 to 3-230.B.55; while the tenders were renumbered 15.B.251 to 15.B.305. Forty-six survived World War II, the last was withdrawn in 1960, having been used on Saint-Mariens to Bordeaux local services.

None have been preserved, but the Cité du train in Mulhouse has one of the similar Midi, locomotives, No. 1314.

References

External links
 CHEMINS DE FER DE L'ETAT locomotive specifications

..3701
4-6-0 locomotives
Fives-Lille locomotives
Schneider locomotives
Railway locomotives introduced in 1901
Standard gauge locomotives of France
Passenger locomotives 
Scrapped locomotives